The Changing Same is the third studio album to be released by Japanese singer Ken Hirai. It was released on June 21, 2000 under Sony Music Japan subsidiary DefSTAR Records. The name comes from a term coined by the poet Amiri Baraka.

Track titles are: "Here Comes K.H.," "Love Love Love,"　"Why," "Affair," "The Flower Is You," "Brighten Up," "K.O.L.," "Ladynapper," "Unfit in Love," "Wonderful World," "Turn off the Lights," "Rakuen 楽園," "Aoi Tori アオイトリ," "The Changing Same: Kawariyuku Kawaranaimono (変わりゆく変わらないもの)"

Chart positions
Oricon Sales Chart (Japan)

External links
 official website

2000 albums
Ken Hirai albums